Kesar (also Romanized as Kesār) is a village in Saidiyeh Rural District, Bostan District, Dasht-e Azadegan County, Khuzestan Province, Iran. According to the 2006 census, its population was 76, in 10 families.

References 

Populated places in Dasht-e Azadegan County